Special Delivery may refer to:
Special delivery (postal service), a postal service for urgent postal packets

Literature
"Special Delivery" (short story), a 1953 short story by Damon Knight
Special Delivery (novel), a 1997 novel by Danielle Steel
Special Delivery, a Thomas & Friends 2006 PC game

Music
Special Delivery (38 Special album), a 1978 album by .38 Special
Special Delivery (Dottie West album), a 1980 album by Dottie West
Special Delivery, an album by Milly y los Vecinos
"Special Delivery" (song), a song by rapper G. Dep
"Special Delivery", a song by the 1910 Fruitgum Company from the 1969 album Indian Giver
"Special Delivery", a song by The Offspring from the 2000 album Conspiracy of One
"Special Delivery", a song by Bridget Kelly, her debut single from 2012

Film
 Special Delivery (1922 film), directed by Fatty Arbuckle
 Special Delivery (1927 film), also directed by Arbuckle
 Special Delivery (1946 film), produced by the United States Army Air Forces
 Special Delivery (1955 film), directed by John Brahm
 Special Delivery (1976 film), with Cybill Shepherd and Sorrell Booke
 Special Delivery (1978 film), winner of the 1978 Academy Award for Animated Short Film
 Special Delivery (1999 film), film with Brie Larson, Logan O'Brien and Penny Marshall
 Special Delivery (2000 film), television film with Andy Dick
 Special Delivery (2002 film), French film
 Special Delivery (2008 film), television film with Lisa Edelstein & Brenda Song
 Special Delivery (2022 film), South Korean crime action film
 A Special Delivery, a 1916 film starring Oliver Hardy

Television
Special Delivery (TV series), a Nickelodeon block of programming that existed in the 1980s and early 1990s
Special Delivery, a 2008 web series on  MySpaceTV
Brandy: Special Delivery, a 2002 reality show starring R&B-singer Brandy
"Special Delivery", an episode of the TV series Beavis and Butt-head
"Special Delivery", an episode of the TV series CSI: Miami
"Special Delivery", an episode of the TV series Pucca
"Special Delivery", an episode of the TV series Rugrats
"Special Delivery", an episode of the TV series Wow! Wow! Wubbzy!